Anatoli Anatolyevich Kanishchev (born 11 December 1971) is a former Russian professional association footballer.

Club career
He made his debut in the Russian Premier League in 1995 for FC Spartak-Alania Vladikavkaz.

Honours

Club
 Russian Premier League champion: 1995, 1998, 1999.
 Russian Premier League runner-up: 1996.
 Kazakhstan Premier League bronze: 1993.
 Russian Cup winner: 1998.

Individual 
CIS Cup top goalscorer: 1998

European club competitions
 1995–96 UEFA Cup with FC Alania Vladikavkaz: 2 games.
 1997–98 UEFA Champions League qualification with FC Alania Vladikavkaz: 1 game.
 1996–97 UEFA Cup with FC Alania Vladikavkaz: 2 games.
 1997–98 UEFA Cup with FC Alania Vladikavkaz: 4 games.
 1998–99 UEFA Champions League with FC Spartak Moscow: 5 games.

International career
He made his debut for Russia national football team on 1 September 1996 in the 1998 FIFA World Cup qualifier against Cyprus.

References

External links
 Player profile 

1971 births
Footballers from Voronezh
Living people
Soviet footballers
Russian footballers
Russia international footballers
FC Spartak Vladikavkaz players
FC Spartak Moscow players
FC Dynamo Moscow players
FC Luch Vladivostok players
Russian Premier League players
Kazakhstan Premier League players
Russian expatriate footballers
Expatriate footballers in Kazakhstan
Russian expatriate sportspeople in Kazakhstan
Association football forwards
FC Fakel Voronezh players